Grandperrin's giant sawbelly (Hoplostethus grandperrini) is a slimehead native to the Norfolk Ridge and waters off southern New Caledonia at  in depth. It was named after Dr. René Grandperrin, a retired chief scientist who worked at ORSTOM Nouméa.

References

External links
 

Grandperrin's giant sawbelly
Fish of New Caledonia
Endemic fauna of New Caledonia
Grandperrin's giant sawbelly